Two vessels of the United States Navy have been named USS Panther.

 The first  was the former Austin, an auxiliary cruiser. It was redesignated AD-6.
 The second USS Panther (IX-105) was the former submarine chaser USS SC-1470.

United States Navy ship names